Håreina Station is a railway station in Aurland, Norway, on the Flåm Line. The station opened on 1 August 1940.

References
Bibliography

Notes

Railway stations on the Flåm Line
Railway stations in Aurland
Railway stations opened in 1940
1940 establishments in Norway